Bocage's wall lizard (Podarcis bocagei) is a species of lizard in the family Lacertidae. The species is endemic to the Iberian Peninsula. Its natural habitats are temperate forests, temperate shrubland, Mediterranean-type shrubby vegetation, sandy shores, rural gardens, and urban areas. The IUCN does not consider it to be threatened.

Etymology
Both the specific name, bocagei, and the common name, Bocage's wall lizard, are in honor of Portuguese zoologist José Vicente Barbosa du Bocage.

Description
Males are larger than females. It is a sturdy lizard, somewhat flattened, and resembling Carbonell's wall lizard (Podarcis carbonelli). The dorsal surface is usually grey or yellowish-brown, but is sometimes green in males, copiously speckled with rows of dark markings. The flanks may be brownish or yellowish. The underparts are white, yellow, pink, or orange, but there are not any of the small blue spots along the edge of the belly which are often present in Carbonell's wall lizard.

Geographic range
Bocage's wall lizard is found in northern Portugal and northwestern Spain as far southwards as the River Douro.

Habitat

Reproduction
P. bocagei is oviparous. Sexually mature females lay 2-4 clutches of eggs each year. Clutch size varies from 2 to 9 eggs.

Conservation status
Bocage's wall lizard is common in suitable habitat within its range. The population is steady and faces no specific threats and the International Union for Conservation of Nature has assessed its conservation status as being of "least concern".

References

Further reading
Arnold EN, Burton JA (1978). A Field Guide to the Reptiles and Amphibians of Britain and Europe. London: Collins. 272 pp. . (Podarcis bocagei, p. 143 + Plate 24 + Map 74).
Engelmann W-E, Fritzsche J, Günther R, Obst FJ (1993). Lurche und Kriechthiere Europas. Radebeul, Germany: Neumann Verlag. 440 pp. (including 324 color plates, 186 figures, 205 maps). (in German).
Seoane VL (1885). "Identidad de Lacerta schreiberi  y Lacerta viridis, var. gadovii  é investigaciones herpetológicas de Galicia ". La Coruña 1884: 1-19. (Lacerta muralis var. bocagei, new variation, pp. 18–19). (in Spanish).

Podarcis
Endemic reptiles of the Iberian Peninsula
Lizards of Europe
Reptiles described in 1885
Taxa named by Víctor López Seoane
Taxonomy articles created by Polbot